A she-wolf is a female gray wolf (Canis lupus).

She-wolf or she wolf may also refer to:

 She-wolf (Roman mythology), from the tale of Romulus and Remus, a traditional symbol of Rome

Film 
 The She Wolf (1919 film), a 1919 American silent short western film
 The She-Wolf (1931 film), a 1931 American drama film
 The She-Wolf (1951 film), a Greek film
 La lupa (1953 film), also known as She-wolf, an Italian film by director Alberto Lattuada based on the short story by Giovanni Verga
 The She-Wolf (1965 film) (Spanish: La Loba), a Spanish-language film directed by Rafael Baledón
 Ilsa, She Wolf of the SS, a 1975 Nazisploitation film
 La lupa (1996 film), also known as The She Wolf, an Italian film by Gabriele Lavia based on the short story by Giovanni Verga

Music 
She Wolf, a 2009 dance-pop album by Shakira
"She Wolf" (Shakira song), the title track from the album
"She-Wolf" (Megadeth song), a song by Megadeth from the 1997 album Cryptic Writings
"She Wolf (Falling to Pieces)", a single by David Guetta from the 2012 album Nothing but the Beat 2.0
She-Wolf, a 1981 country blues album by Jessie Mae Hemphill

Television 
She Wolf: The Last Sentinel, a Philippine fantasy horror television series
She-Wolf (TV series), a 1990s horror fiction television series

People 
Isabella of France (1295–1358), wife of Edward II of England popularly known as the "she-wolf"
Margaret of Anjou (1430–1482), wife of Henry VI of England - called "She-wolf of France but worse" in Shakespeare's Henry VI

Other 
 She-Wolf of the Capitol, or Capitoline Wolf, a bronze sculpture inspired by the founding legend of Rome
The She-Wolf, a 1943 post-surrealist painting by Jackson Pollock
 "The She-Wolf", a story by Saki from the 1914 book Beasts and Super-Beasts
 "The She-Wolf", a story by Giovanni Verga

See also
La lupa (disambiguation)
Loba (disambiguation)
Romulus and Remus